TV Art may be:

 TV Art (Serbia), defunct cultural television channel from Serbia
 TV Art (Macedonia), television channel from Macedonia